is a superhero film that was released on April 1, 2011, to commemorate the 40th anniversary of the Kamen Rider franchise. While the film features all of the franchise's protagonists, the main heroes of the original Kamen Rider TV series (1 and 2), Kamen Rider Den-O, and Kamen Rider OOO serve as the main characters. The film's subtitle "Let's Go Kamen Riders" is an homage to the theme song of the original series, . The film also marks the 60th anniversary of the Toei Company, and features cameos from Kikaider, Kikaider 01, Inazuman, and Zubat from four of Shotaro Ishinomori's other works.

A preview of the film was originally scheduled for March 15, 2011, but was cancelled after the venue's structure was compromised as a result of the 2011 Tōhoku earthquake and tsunami.

Let's Go Kamen Riders opened at the #1 spot in the Japanese box offices in the first two weekends of its release.

Plot
Eiji Hino battles three Mole Imagin until the monsters use a nearby boy, Naoki, to travel through time. Kotaro Nogami and Teddy arrive in the DenLiner and determine the Mole Imagin traveled to November 11, 1971. Hino's ally Ankh convinces him to join Nogami and board the DenLiner, where they are warned by the train's owner to stay aboard to avoid disrupting time.

Arriving in 1971, Nogami eliminates the Mole Imagin while Ankh attempts to steal his fellow Greeed's Core Medals. Hino goes after him, but Nogami and the DenLiner's Imagin crew discover and retrieve the pair. Unbeknownst to them, Ankh dropped a Cell Medal, which a Shocker Combatman finds and presents to General Black.

After being returned to the present, Ankh and Hino pursue Naoki and his friends Mitsuru and Shigeru after the boys pickpocket them, but run into Shocker-aligned police officers. After Ankh and Hino escape and encounter the kids again, the former conducts research into Shocker, learning that they managed to take over Japan and merged themselves with other Kamen Riders' enemies to take over the world and render humanity nearly extinct. The Shocker Police find them again, forcing the group to flee while Hino stays behind to fight them, but he is defeated by Shocker's elite soldiers, Kamen Riders 1 and 2. After the group is rescued by the DenLiner crew, they learn that Shocker found a Core Medal in 1971 and combined it with the Cell Medal that Ankh dropped to create the Shocker Greeed, who defeated 1 and 2 and allowed Shocker to brainwash them. Hino offers to help, but Nogami drops him off in a different location, where he meets the Hina Izumi of the altered present. The DenLiner crew learn too late that Mitsuru, Naoki, and Ankh are still with them.

Returning to the past, Nogami recovers the Cell Medal, but Ankh drops another one, which is found by a Kamen Rider Scout named Nokko, who mistakes the DenLiner crew for Shocker agents. She reconvenes with her fellow Scouts, but Black takes the Cell Medal from them. Nogami and Momotaros battle Black's forces while Mitsuru and Naoki escape with the Scouts. 1 and 2 cover them and give Black a fake Cell Medal with a transmitter to locate Shocker's headquarters while Nogami destroys the original Cell Medal.

Arriving at Shocker's headquarters, the Riders realize they fell into a trap and Nogami took the fake Medal before Black creates the Shocker Greeed to attack them. Outside, Shocker forces attack the DenLiner, forcing the train's owner to order a retreat. The Riders get Naoki and Teddy onboard, but they jump off before it travels through time. The DenLiner crew return to the altered present and rejoin Hino, but he and Nogami are captured while the others escape. Arriving at the kids' spare hideout, Ankh, Momotaros, Izumi, and the kids find Teddy's body and a time capsule containing a letter from Naoki. He reveals Teddy sacrificed himself to get him, 1, and 2 to safety. Shocker forces attack again, though Momotaros and Ankh get captured while covering Izumi and the kids' escape.

The next day, Shocker prepares to publicly execute their captives, but Shigeru returns Hino's Rider equipment before 1 and 2 appear, revealing a turncoat Shocker scientist undid their brainwashing. The audience revolts as the captives are freed. 1, 2, Nogami, and Hino are joined by the rest of their Rider allies, Kikaider, Kikaider 01, Inazuman and Zubat, who help them destroy Black, the Shocker Greeed, and their forces. Shocker's Great Leader overpowers the Riders until Hino receives new Rider powers, which he uses to weaken the Great Leader. Enraged, the Great Leader transforms into Rock Great Leader, but more Riders join the fight and destroy him. Following this, the scientist reveals himself as an older Naoki, who lived in the past, married Nokko, and became Mitsuru's father. Hino bids Nogami farewell before the DenLiner embarks on its next destination.

Internet spin-off films
Titled , the films total to 48 shorts that were released every Friday beginning March 11, 2011. Each webisode focuses on a Kamen Rider that matches a specific Zodiac sign and blood type. There are eight different formats for the web movies:

 : Urataros' segment. At the Cous Coussier restaurant, Eiji wants to marry Hina, and asks her father for his blessing. However, Hina's father is General Shadow, who disapproves of vagabonds and unreliable people marrying his daughter. Eiji becomes the featured Kamen Rider to deal with the situation differently.
 : Naoki is served lunch by Hina. Unfortunately, the meal consists mainly of bell peppers, which he hates. The featured Kamen Rider arrives at the restaurant to help make the meal more appetizing for Naoki.
 : Kivat's segment. While looking at the movie posters for Let's Go Kamen Riders, Eiji and Ankh argue over who is more talented. The featured Kamen Rider arrives at the restaurant to calm the duo with his personality.
 : Sieg's segment. The featured Kamen Rider makes his speech at the First National Kamen Rider State of the Union Address in front of a crowd of Shocker grunts. There, he reveals a small trivia about himself, often arguing about a critical flaw in his series which leads to a blind rant before being dragged off the stage by Kamen Rider #1 (or Kamen Rider #2), Kamen Rider Den-O and Kamen Rider OOO.
 : Kivat's segment. In a household with a "family" of Shocker grunts, the son gets an item based on the featured Kamen Rider's lucky charm and learns how to use it.
 : Momotaros' segment. The featured Kamen Rider visits Cous Coussier, where Eiji and Hina must determine what his lucky food is. The meal prepared by Hina is always correct, as it reflects the personality of the Kamen Rider.
 : Kivat's segment. Ankh goes to the Cous Coussier's kitchen to satisfy his hunger for popsicles, but discovers that the popsicle box in the freezer is empty. Kivat then determines Ankh's lucky color based on the featured form of Kamen Rider Kuuga. The next scene has Ankh wearing the lucky color and grabbing a popsicle with a flavor of that color.
 : Kivat's segment. The featured card-based Kamen Rider plays a game of poker with Kamen Rider Garren, Kamen Rider Chalice, and General Shadow, but has a bad hand. Using his own tactics, he must think of a way to win the round.

Each webisode is alternatively hosted by Sieg, Momotaros, Kivat and Urataros.

Cast
 : 
 : 
 , : 
 : 
 : 
 : 
 : 
 : 
 : 
 : 
 : 
 : 
 : 
 : 
 :

Voice actors
 : 
 : 
 , : 
 , : 
 : 
 : 
 : 
 , : 
 : 
 : 
 : 
 : 
 , : 
 : 
  (1): 
 Mole Imagin (2): 
 Mole Imagin (3), : 
 O-Scanner Voice: 
 Gaia Memory Voice:

Theme song 
 "Let's Go RiderKick 2011"
 Artist: Kamen Rider Girls

References

External links
 
 

2011 films
OOO, Den-O, All Riders: Let's Go Kamen Rider
Crossover tokusatsu films
Dystopian films
Films set in 1971
Films set in 2011
Films about time travel
Films directed by Osamu Kaneda
2010s Japanese-language films